Arthur Raymond Robinson (March 12, 1881March 17, 1961) was a United States senator from Indiana.

Early life
Born in Pickerington, Ohio, Robinson attended the common schools, graduated from the Ohio Northern University in 1901 (B. Comm. Sci.), the Indiana Law School (now Indiana University Robert H. McKinney School of Law) in Indianapolis in 1910 (LL.B.), and the University of Chicago in 1913 (B.Ph.). He was admitted to the bar in 1910 and commenced practice in Indianapolis.

Career
Robinson was a member of the Indiana Senate from 1914 to 1918, and was the Republican floor leader during the entire period. During the First World War he served in the U.S. Army as a first lieutenant, captain, and major, and served in France in the Army of Occupation. He resumed the practice of law and was judge of Marion County Superior Court in 1921-1922. He resumed the practice of law in Indianapolis, in 1922 and was appointed on October 20, 1925, to the U.S. Senate by Governor Edward L. Jackson and subsequently elected on November 2, 1926, to fill the vacancy caused by the death of Samuel M. Ralston. He was reelected in 1928, and served from October 20, 1925, to January 3, 1935; in 1934 he was an unsuccessful candidate for reelection. While in the Senate he was chairman of the Committee on Pensions (Seventieth through Seventy-second Congresses).

Private life

As a Freemason, Robinson was a member of Indianapolis' Capital City Lodge 312 where he served as Master in 1916. He was coroneted a 33° Scottish Rite Mason in the Valley of Indianapolis in 1924, and served on the Supreme Council of DeMolay between 1925-27. He remained a Mason until his death in 1961, and his grave bears a 33° symbol.

Death
Robinson practiced law in Indianapolis until his death there in 1961; interment was in Washington Park Cemetery East.

References

External links

 Retrieved on 2008-03-18

1881 births
1961 deaths
People from Pickerington, Ohio
Republican Party Indiana state senators
Indiana state court judges
United States Army officers
Ohio Northern University alumni
University of Chicago alumni
Indiana University Robert H. McKinney School of Law alumni
United States Army personnel of World War I
Republican Party United States senators from Indiana
20th-century American politicians
20th-century American judges